

Charles Bally (4 February 1865, Geneva – 10 April 1947, Geneva) was a Swiss linguist from the Geneva School. He lived from 1865 to 1947 and was, like Ferdinand de Saussure, from Switzerland. His parents were Jean Gabriel, a teacher, and Henriette, the owner of a cloth store. Bally was married three times: first to Valentine Leirens, followed by Irma Baptistine Doutre, who was sent into a mental institution in 1915, and finally with Alice Bellicot. In addition to his edition of de Saussure's lectures, Course in General Linguistics (co-edited by Albert Sechehaye), Charles Bally also played an important role in linguistics.

From 1883 to 1885 he studied classical languages and literature in Geneva. He continued his studies from 1886 to 1889 in Berlin where he was awarded a Ph.D. After his studies he worked as a private teacher for the royal family of Greece from 1889 to 1893. Bally returned to Geneva and taught at a business school from 1893 on and moved to the Progymnasium, a grammar school, from 1913 to 1939. He also worked as PD at the university from 1893 to 1913. From 1913 to 1939 he had a professorship for general linguistic and comparative Indo-European studies which he took over from Ferdinand de Saussure.

Besides his works about subjecthood in the French language he also wrote about the crisis in French language and language classes. He was active in interlinguistics, serving as a consultant to the research association that presented Interlingua in 1951. Today Charles Bally is regarded as the founding-father of linguistic theories of style and much honored for his theories of phraseology. In terms of modern stylistics he dealt with the expressive function of signs.

See also
 Structuralism
 Leonard Bloomfield
 Roman Jakobson
 Michael Silverstein
 Ferdinand de Saussure
 Bally (surname)

References

 Traité de stylistique française (1909)
 Le Langage et la Vie (1913) 
 La pensée et la langue, Bulletin de la société linguistique de Paris 22-23 (1922)
 La Crise du français, notre langue maternelle à l'école (1930)
 Linguistique générale et linguistique française (1932) 
 L’arbitraire du signe. Valeur et signification (1940)
 Le langage et la vie (troisième édition 1977)
 Amacker, René (1995), "Geneva School, after Saussure", in Koerner, E.F.K. & Asher, R.E. (eds.), Concise History of the Language Sciences, Oxford: Pergamon, pp. 239–243.
 Esterhill, F., Interlingua Institute: A history, Interlingua Institute (2000).

Further reading
 G. Redard, Bibliographie chronologique des publications de Charles Bally, in Cahiers Ferdinand de Saussure 36, 1982, 25-41 
 W. Hellmann, Charles Bally, 1988 
 S. Durrer, Introduction à la linguistique de Charles Bally, 1998

External links

Linguists from Switzerland
Structuralists
Writers from Geneva
1865 births
1947 deaths